The Ghana national rugby league team represents Ghana in the sport of rugby league.

Coming into existence in 2012, the Ghanaian Rugby League project was started up by the Rugby League European Federation (RLEF) and UK Sport International’s programme after Rugby League 9s were introduced as a Category 3 Sport by the Commonwealth Sports Committee.

Squad

Squad for the 2019 MEA Rugby League Championship;
Marcus Alexander Amate Neil
Albert Abeku Amonoo Nelson
Benjamin Anane
Collins Kweku Ofosu
Desmond Atsu Geotrah
Nigel Nii Ampim Sackey
On Yelib Oliver Puman
Reece Connor Rance
Samuel A. Aboagye Sarpong
Darryl Amoatey
Nasiru Abdul Latif
Eric Tettegah
Philip Asomani
John Bless Mensah
Enoch Abam Niikoi
Alibah Riddick Nana Abrokwa
Isaac Jordan Annan
Elikem Koesi Asafo
Richard Amevor
Chris Da Gama
Michael Quaye
William Pearce Biney
Levi Osei

Results

References

External links

National rugby league teams
National sports teams of Ghana